Giacomo Della Rocca (1569 – 1644) was a Roman Catholic prelate who served as Bishop of Termia (1634–1644).

Biography
Giacomo Della Rocca was born in 1569. On 25 September 1634, he was appointed during the papacy of Pope Urban VIII as Bishop of Termia.
He served as Bishop of Termia until his death in 1644. While bishop, he was the principal co-consecrator of Francesco Antonio Frasella, Titular Archbishop of Myra (1637); and Matthieu de Castro Malo, Vicar Apostolic of Great Mogul (1637).

References 

17th-century Roman Catholic bishops in the Republic of Venice
Bishops appointed by Pope Urban VIII
1569 births
1644 deaths